Garuda Garvabhangam is a 1936 Tamil-language film starring M. D. Parthasarathy, M. S. Mohanambal, Serukulathur Sama, Vidwan Srinivasan, T. S. Mani, Vimala and M. D. Subramania Mudaliar. It was directed by R. Padmanaban.

Production 

The plot of the film is based on a Hindu mythological episode on the life of the Hindu God Krishna. A number of movies had been made on the episode, the first being a silent film by A. Narayanan in 1929. But the 1936 version in Tamil appears to be the first talkie made on the subject. The film was remade in Telugu by Ghantasala Balaramayya in the year 1943. The film was shot entirely in Pioneer Studios in Calcutta.

References

External links
 

1936 films
1930s Tamil-language films
Indian black-and-white films